is a train station in Heguri, Ikoma District, Nara Prefecture, Japan.

Lines 
Kintetsu
Ikoma Line

Surrounding Area 
 Heguri Town Office
 
 Tomb of Prince Nagaya

Bus
 Heguri Town Community Bus

Adjacent stations

References

Railway stations in Japan opened in 1926
Railway stations in Nara Prefecture